Nelly del Carmen Vargas Pérez (born 13 August 1959) is a Mexican politician affiliated with the Convergence. As of 2013 she served as Deputy of the LXII Legislature of the Mexican Congress representing Tabasco.

References

1959 births
Living people
Politicians from Tabasco
Women members of the Chamber of Deputies (Mexico)
Citizens' Movement (Mexico) politicians
21st-century Mexican politicians
21st-century Mexican women politicians
Universidad Juárez Autónoma de Tabasco alumni
University of Monterrey alumni
Deputies of the LXII Legislature of Mexico
Members of the Chamber of Deputies (Mexico) for Tabasco